This is a list of supermarket chains in Lithuania.

See also 
 Companies of NASDAQ OMX Vilnius

Former operations 
CBA (ceased operated in Lithuania 2015)
Fresh Market (ceased operated in Lithuania 2015)

References 

 Supermarkets
Supermarkets
Lithuania